The spotted trunkfish (Lactophrys bicaudalis) is a member of the family Ostraciidae. It can be found in reefs throughout the Caribbean, as well as the south western Atlantic Ocean. The species gets its name from the black spots it has covered over its whitish or yellow-golden body. In many Caribbean countries, it is colloquially known as box-fish or cow-fish, and shell-fish in the Eastern Caribbean.

Description
Members of this family are known as boxfishes because they have a hard outer covering consisting of hexagonal plate-like scales fused together into a solid, triangular or box-like carapace. The eyes, snout, fins and tail protrude from this. The spotted trunkfish is basically white or yellowish with a regular pattern of numerous black spots on the body and tailfin. Just behind the eye, adult fish have a diagonal row of three white spots where black ones would have been expected. The snout is plain white, there are no spines above the eye, and there are a pair of sharp spines in front of the anal fin.

Distribution and habitat
The spotted trunkfish is found in the Caribbean Sea, the southern half of the Gulf of Mexico, Ascension Island, and the northeastern coast of South America as far east as Brazil.

Ecology
Because of the heavy armoured scales, the spotted trunkfish is normally limited to slow movements, performed by rippling its dorsal and anal fins and gently beating its pectoral fins. If faster motion is required, it can additionally use the tail fin for propulsion. It is a benthic species, feeding on or near the seabed. Its diet includes crabs, shrimps, molluscs, sea urchins, starfish, brittle stars, sea cucumbers, tunicates and seagrasses.

The spotted trunkfish, like all trunkfish of the genus Lactophrys, secretes a colourless toxin from glands on its skin when touched. The toxin is only dangerous when ingested, so there is no immediate harm to divers. Predators however, as large as nurse sharks, can die as a result of eating a trunkfish.

References

External links

 Spotted trunkfish at switchzoo.com

Ostraciidae
Fish described in 1758
Taxa named by Carl Linnaeus
Fish of the Atlantic Ocean